Asteronia is a genus of fungi in the Microthyriaceae family.

Species as accepted by Species Fungorum;
 Asteronia lauraceae 
 Asteronia africana 

Former species;
 Asteronia appendiculosa  = Vizella appendiculosa, Vizellaceae
 Asteronia erysiphoides  = Asterostomella erysiphoides, Asterinaceae

References

External links
Index Fungorum

Microthyriales